Courts of Ohio include:
;State courts of Ohio

Supreme Court of Ohio
Ohio District Courts of Appeal (12 districts)
Ohio Court of Claims
Ohio Courts of Common Pleas
Ohio Municipal Courts
Ohio County Courts
Ohio Mayor's Courts

Federal courts located in this state
United States Court of Appeals for the Sixth Circuit (headquartered in Cincinnati, having jurisdiction over the United States District Courts of Kentucky, Michigan, Ohio, and Tennessee)
United States District Court for the Northern District of Ohio
United States District Court for the Southern District of Ohio

Former federal courts of Ohio
United States District Court for the District of Ohio (extinct, subdivided)

References

External links
National Center for State Courts – directory of state court websites.

Courts in the United States